Strepsiceros may refer to:
 Strepsiceros, a genus of butterflies in the family Tortricidae, synonym of Strepsicrates
 Strepsiceros Rafinesque, 1815, a genus of mammals in the family Bovidae, synonym of Tragelaphus
 Strepsiceros Smith, 1827, a genus of mammals in the family Bovidae, synonym of Tragelaphus